The men's artistic individual all-around competition at the 1960 Summer Olympics was held at the Baths of Caracalla from 5 to 7 September. It was the thirteenth appearance of the event. There were 130 competitors from 28 nations. Each nation entered a team of six gymnasts or up to two individual gymnasts. The event was won by Boris Shakhlin of the Soviet Union, the nation's third consecutive victory in the event, putting the Soviets second all-time to that point (behind Italy's four). Takashi Ono of Japan and Yuri Titov of the Soviet Union repeated as silver and bronze medalists, respectively; they were the fifth and sixth men to earn multiple medals in the event.

Background

This was the 13th appearance of the men's individual all-around. The first individual all-around competition had been held in 1900, after the 1896 competitions featured only individual apparatus events. A men's individual all-around has been held every Games since 1900.

Six of the top 10 gymnasts from the 1956 Games returned: silver medalist Takashi Ono, fourth-place finisher Masao Takemoto, and tenth-place finisher Nobuyuki Aihara of Japan and bronze medalist Yury Titov, seventh-place finisher Albert Azaryan, and eighth-place finisher Boris Shakhlin of the Soviet Union. Shakhlin was the reigning (1958) World Champion, with Ono and Titov finishing second and third.

Morocco, South Korea, and the United Arab Republic each made their debut in the event. France and Italy both made their 11th appearance, tied for most among nations.

Competition format

The gymnastics all-around events continued to use the aggregation format. All entrants in the gymnastics competitions performed both a compulsory exercise and a voluntary exercise for each apparatus. The scores for all 12 exercises were summed to give an individual all-around score.

These exercise scores were also used for qualification for the new apparatus finals. The two exercises (compulsory and voluntary) for each apparatus were summed to give an apparatus score; the top 6 in each apparatus participated in the finals; others were ranked 7th through 130th. There was no all-around final.

Exercise scores ranged from 0 to 10, apparatus scores from 0 to 20, and individual totals from 0 to 120.

Schedule

All times are Central European Time (UTC+1)

Results

References

Men's artistic individual all-around
1960